Kamran Talattof is a professor of Persian and Iranian studies at the University of Arizona.

His focus of research is  gender, ideology, culture, and language, with an emphasis on literature (Modern and Classical); contemporary Islamic issues, Middle Eastern culture; and the Persian language. He has translated contemporary debates in Islam from Persian, Arabic, French, and Urdu into English.

In addition to co-authoring  the textbook "Modern Persian: Spoken and Written", Kamran Talatoff is a coordinator of the University of Arizona's Online Persian Language Learning Resource Project.

Published works
Talattof is the author or co-author of The Politics of Writing in Iran: A History of Modern Persian Literature; Modern Persian: Spoken and Written with D. Stilo and J. Clinton, He co-edited Essays on Nima Yushij: Animating Modernism in Persian Poetry with A. Karimi-Hakkak; The Poetry of Nizami Ganjavi: Knowledge, Love, and Rhetoric with J. Clinton; and Contemporary Debates in Islam: An Anthology of Modernist and Fundamentalist Thought with M. Moaddel. He is the co-translator of Women without Men by Shahrnush Parsipur, with J. Sharlet and Touba and the Meaning of Night by Parsipur, with H. Houshmand.

His most recent book is Modernity, Sexuality, and Ideology in Iran: The Life and Legacy of a Popular Female Artist (Syracuse: Syracuse University Press, 2011), which has won one or two awards.

References

Living people
University of Arizona faculty
Iranian expatriate academics
Year of birth missing (living people)
Iranologists